A job is  a regular activity performed in exchange for payment, or a task or project that may or may not be compensated.

Job may also refer to:

Places
 Job, Kentucky, an unincorporated community in the United States
 Job, Puy-de-Dôme, a commune in central France

People

 Job (given name)
 Job (surname)

Arts, entertainment, and media

Literature
 Job (novel), a novel by Joseph Roth
 Job: A Comedy of Justice, a novel by Robert A. Heinlein

Other media
 Job (Shea), a sculpture by Judith Shea
 Job, a 1950 opera by Luigi Dallapiccola
 Job, an 1892 oratorio by Hubert Parry
 Job: A Masque for Dancing, a ballet by Ralph Vaughan Williams

Computing
 Job (computing) or job stream, a unit of work in a computer processing environment
 Job (Unix), a representation of a process group for process control in a Unix shell

Religion
 Patriarch Job of Moscow, d. 1607, Russian leader
 Job (biblical figure), the central character in the Book of Job
 Book of Job, part of the Hebrew Bible
 Job in Islam, a prophet in Islam

Other uses
 Job (professional wrestling), in professional wrestling, the act of losing a match
 JOB (rolling papers), a brand of cigarette paper
Job, slang for a crime, especially a robbery

See also
 J.O.B. Records, a defunct record label which specialized in blues and R&B
 The Job (disambiguation)
 Jobs (disambiguation)
 Jobbing (disambiguation)
 Jobber (disambiguation)
 Jobe